is the third studio album by Japanese heavy metal band Dir En Grey. The album was released on January 30, 2002. It has helped them gain popularity across Asia. The first press edition came with an extra booklet of lyrics and the cover booklet came in color, as opposed to the normal release. Unlike their previous two albums, Kisō did not feature extra poems and images per song in the liner notes; rather, the standard booklet came with the band's own English translation of the lyrics, while the extra booklet in the first pressing contained the original Japanese lyrics.

Track listing

Notes
 A re-recording of "Undecided" was featured on their 2008 single Glass Skin.
 Re-recordings of "Bottom of the death valley" and "Karasu" were featured on their 2013 EP The Unraveling.
 A re-recording of "Kigan" was featured on the limited editions for their 2018 album The Insulated World.
 A re-recording of "The Domestic Fucker Family" appears as a b-side on their 2021 single Oboro under the title "T.D.F.F.".

Chart positions

Album

Singles

References

2002 albums
Dir En Grey albums